Gama, Da Gama or Gamma is a Portuguese and Bantu surname. Originating in southern Europe, Gama is a common surname in Portugal, Spain, Italy and countries colonized by Portugal, such as Brazil and Southern parts of Africa.

People
Antonio de León y Gama (1735–1802), Mexican astronomer, anthropologist and writer
António de Gama Pereira (1520–1604), Portuguese jurist
Armando Gama (1954–2022), Portuguese singer
Basílio da Gama (1740–1795), Portuguese-Brazilian poet and member of the Society of Jesus
Bruno Gama (born 1987), Portuguese footballer
Cristóvão da Gama (c.1516–1542), Portuguese military commander, explorer, and son of Vasco da Gama
Dagoberto Gama (born 1959), Mexican actor
Diego de Souza Gama Silva (born 1984), Brazilian footballer
Diogo Gama (born 1981), Portuguese rugby union player
Domício da Gama (1862–1925), Brazilian journalist, diplomat and writer
Donato Gama da Silva (born 1962), Brazilian footballer
Estêvão da Gama (15th century) (c.1430–1497), Portuguese nobleman and father of Vasco da Gama
Estêvão da Gama (16th century) (c.1505–1576), Portuguese explorer and son of Vasco da Gama
Estêvão da Gama (c.1470), Portuguese explorer and cousin of Vasco da Gama
Francisco de Saldanha da Gama (1723–1776), Portuguese Cardinal Patriarch of Lisbon
Gaspar da Gama (1444–c.1510s), Polish Jew merchant who acted as interpreter in the Portuguese discoveries
Isabel Maria de Gama,  queen dowager of the Bakongo people
Jaime Federico Said Camil Saldaña da Gama, known professionally as Jaime Camil, Mexican actor, singer and television personality
Jaime Gama (born 1947), Portuguese politician
João da Gama (c. 1540 – after 1591), Portuguese explorer and colonial administrator, grandson of Vasco da Gama
Julia Gama (born 1993), Brazilian actress and Miss Brasil 2020 winner
Leovegildo Lins da Gama Júnior (born 1954), Brazilian former professional footballer
Owen Da Gama (born 1961), former South African footballer and manager
Paulo da Gama (c.1465–1499), Portuguese explorer and older brother of Vasco da Gama
Pio Gama Pinto (1927–1965), Kenyan journalist and politician
Saldanha da Gama (1846–1895), admiral of the Brazilian Navy
Sebastião da Gama (1924–1952), Portuguese poet
Vasco da Gama (c.1460s–1524), Portuguese explorer and the first European to reach India by sea
Vasco da Gama (council speaker) (born 1959), South African politician
Vasco da Gama Fernandes (1908–1991), Portuguese politician
Vasco da Gama Rodrigues (1909–1991), Portuguese poet
Zainab Amir Gama (born 1949), Tanzanian politician
Lawrence Gama, Tanzanian politician
Leonidas Gama, Tanzanian politician

See also
Gama (disambiguation)

References

Portuguese-language surnames